Four-time defending champion Esther Vergeer defeated Daniela Di Toro in the final, 6–0, 6–0 to win the women's singles wheelchair tennis title at the 2010 US Open.

Seeds
 Esther Vergeer (champion)
 Sharon Walraven (semifinals)

Draw

Finals

External links 
 Main Draw

Wheelchair Women's Singles

pl:US Open 2010#Gra pojedyncza kobiet na wózkach